The Shubenacadie Provincial Wildlife Park is part of Nova Scotia's Provincial Park System. It is a wildlife park in Shubenacadie, Nova Scotia, Canada. The 40-hectare park includes animals, an interpretive centre, hiking trails, a picnic area and playground.

History

The park began in the late 1940s as a refuge for orphaned white-tailed deer run by Eldon Pace. By the early 1950s there was so much interest from the public that the park officially opened in 1954. Mr. Pace was the superintendent of the park until 1988. Over the decades the park has expanded and developed into one of Nova Scotia's most popular tourist sites. Throughout the park's history countless orphaned and injured animals, birds and reptiles have been cared for and rehabilitated. From the beginning, the park has been educating visitors about wildlife and environmental issues with thousands of school children participating in onsite education programming.

Between 2003 and 2008 the park was regulated as a game sanctuary under the Wildlife Act (R.S.N.S. 1989, c. 504). In 2008 the regulations were changed to officially designate the park as a wildlife park under the act.

Animals

The park is home to about 90 species of mammals and birds including Dall sheep, Indian peafowl, Sable Island pony, moose, black bear, river otter, three species of owl, coyote, skunk, raccoon, marten,  white-tailed deer, woodchuck, three species of fox, kestrel, beaver, turkey vulture, two species of lynx, peregrine falcon, mink, Arctic wolf, red-tailed hawk, gray wolf, bald eagle, porcupine, cougar, snowshoe hare, and European magpie.

Shubenacadie Sam

The Wildlife Park is home to Shubenacadie Sam, one of the first groundhogs in North America to predict the weather for the upcoming year.  Every year on February 2 at sunrise, Sam leaves his house and checks for his shadow.  This fun event always attracts a large crowd eager to see what the spring holds in store for us.

Greenwing Legacy Centre

The Shubenacadie Wildlife Park is also home to the Greenwing Legacy Centre.  This collaboration between Ducks Unlimited Canada and The Shubenacadie Provincial Wildlife Park opened in 2006. Follow the yellow duck prints to discover the wonder of wetlands! The centre is home to many interactive displays about the importance of wetlands, as well as live wetland critters and a gift shop.

References

External links

Zoos in Nova Scotia